Lyman Raion may refer to:
Lyman Raion, Donetsk Oblast, Ukraine
Lyman Raion, Odessa Oblast, Ukraine